Patricio Aylwin Azócar  (26 November 1918 – 19 April 2016) was a Chilean  politician from the Christian Democratic Party, lawyer, author, professor and former senator. He was the first president of Chile after dictator Augusto Pinochet, and his election marked the Chilean transition to democracy in 1990. 

Despite resistance from elements of the Chilean military and government after his election, Aylwin was staunch in his support for the Chilean National Commission for Truth and Reconciliation which exposed the systematic brutalities of the dictatorship.

Early life 
Aylwin, the eldest of the five children of Miguel Aylwin and Laura Azócar, was born in Viña del Mar. An excellent student, he enrolled in the Law School of the University of Chile where he became a lawyer, with the highest distinction, in 1943. He served as professor of administrative law, first at the University of Chile (1946–1967) and also at the School of Law of the Pontifical Catholic University of Chile (1952–1960). He was also professor of civic education and political economy at the National Institute (1946–1963). His brother, Andrés, was also a politician.

On 29 September 1948, he was married to Leonor Oyarzún Ivanovic. They had five children (his daughter Mariana worked as a minister in subsequent governments) and 14 grandchildren (among them, popular telenovela and film actress Paz Bascuñán).

Political career

Aylwin's involvement in politics started in 1945, when he joined the Falange Nacional. Later he was elected president of the Falange in 1950–51. When that party became the Christian Democratic Party of Chile, he served seven terms as its president between 1958 and 1989.

In 1965 he was elected to the National Congress as a Senator. In 1971, he became the president of the Senate. During the government of Popular Unity, headed by Salvador Allende, he was also the president of his party, and he led the democratic opposition to Allende within and without Congress. He is credited, to some degree, with trying to find a peaceful solution to the country's political crisis. Distrusting Allende, Aylwin "demanded that the president appoint only military men to his cabinet as proof of his honest intent," which Allende did only partially, and Aylwin "apparently sided with pro-coup forces, believing that the military would restore democracy to the nation." He stated very plainly that between "a Marxist dictatorship and a dictatorship of our military, I would choose the second."

Aylwin was president of the Christian Democrats until 1976, and after the death of the party's leader, Eduardo Frei, in 1982, he led his party during the military dictatorship. Later he helped establish the Constitutional Studies Group of 24 to reunite the country's democratic sectors against the dictatorship. In 1979 he served as a spokesman in the group that opposed the plebiscite that approved a new constitution.

In 1982, Aylwin was elected vice president of the Christian Democrats. He was among the first to advocate acceptance of the Constitution as a reality in order to facilitate the return to democracy. The opposition eventually met the legal standards imposed by the Pinochet regime and participated in the 1988 plebiscite.

On 5 October 1988, the Chilean national plebiscite was held.  A "Yes" vote would grant Pinochet eight more years as president.  Despite the widespread expectation that Pinochet would be voted an extended term, the "No" campaign triumphed, in part because of a superb media campaign depicted in the 2012 film No.  Patricio Aylwin was at the center of the movement that defeated General Pinochet. After the plebiscite, he participated in negotiations that led the government and the opposition to agree on 54 constitutional reforms, thereby making possible a peaceful transition from 16 years of dictatorship to democracy.

Presidency

Domestic policy
Patricio Aylwin was elected president of the Republic on 14 December 1989.

Although Chile had officially become a democracy, the Chilean military led by Pinochet remained highly powerful during the presidency of Aylwin, and the Constitution ensured the continued influence of Pinochet and his commanders, which prevented his government from achieving many of the goals it had set, such as the restructuring of the Constitutional Court and the reduction of Pinochet's political power. His administration, however, initiated direct municipal elections, the first of which were held in June 1992. In spite of the severe limits imposed on Aylwin's government by the Constitution, over four years, it "altered power relations in its favor in the state, in civil society, and in political society." Pinochet was determined that the military not be punished for its role in overthrowing Allende's government or for the years of military dictatorship.  Aylwin did attempt to bring to justice those in the military who committed abuses.

Economic policy
The Aylwin Government did much to reduce poverty and inequality during its time in office. A tax reform was introduced in 1990 which boosted tax revenues by around 15% and enabled the Aylwin Government to increase government spending on social programs from 9.9% to 11.7% of GDP. By the end of the Aylwin government, unprecedented resources were being allocated to social programs, including an expanded public health programs, vocational and training programs for young Chileans, and a major public housing initiative.

A new Solidarity and Social Investment Fund was set up to direct aid towards poorer communities, and social spending (especially on health and education) increased by around one-third between 1989 and 1993. A new labor law was also enacted in 1990, which expanded trade union rights and collective bargaining while also improving severance pay for workers. The minimum wage was also increased, as were family allowances, pensions, and other benefits. Between 1990 and 1993, real wages grew by 4.6%, while the unemployment rate fell from 7.8% to 6.5%. Spending on education increased by 40% while spending on health increased by 54%. The incomes of poor Chileans increased by 20% in real terms (above the rate of inflation) under the Aylwin Government, while increases to the minimum wage meant that it was 36% higher in real terms in 1993 than in 1990. A slum clearance program was also initiated, with over 100,000 new homes built under the Aylwin Government, compared with 40,000 per annum under the Pinochet Government.

Under the Aylwin government, the numbers of Chileans living in poverty significantly decreased, with a United Nations report estimating that the percentage of the population living in poverty had fallen from around 40% of the population in 1989 to around 33% by 1993.

End
He was succeeded in 1994 by the election of Christian Democrat Eduardo Frei Ruiz-Tagle, the son of the late President Eduardo Frei Montalva.

Post-presidency

Aylwin was president of the Corporation for Democracy and Justice, a non-profit organization he founded to develop approaches to eliminating poverty and to strengthen ethical values in politics. In 1998, he received the J. William Fulbright Prize for International Understanding.

Aylwin received honorary degrees from universities in Australia, Canada, Colombia, France, Italy, Japan, Portugal, Spain, and the United States, as well as seven Chilean universities. In 1997, the Council of Europe awarded the North-South Prize to Aylwin and Mary Robinson, former president of Ireland, for their contributions to fostering human rights, democracy, and cooperation between Europe and Latin America.

Death 

On 18 December 2015, Aylwin was hospitalized in Santiago after suffering a cranial injury at home. He died on 19 April 2016, aged 97 from natural causes from respiratory insufficiency.

His state funeral was held on 22 April 2016 and was buried at Cementerio General de Santiago in the following days.

Honours and awards

Foreign honours 
:
 Honorary Recipient of the Order of the Crown of the Realm (1991)
:
 Grand Collar of the Order of Liberty (26 August 1992)
:
 Collar of the Order of Charles III (1991)
 Knight of the Collar of the Order of Isabella the Catholic (1990)

Awards 

Council of Europe: North–South Prize (1997)
Fulbright Association: William Fulbright Prize for International Understanding (1988)

References

External links 

Official Biography in section Galería de Presidentes (President's Gallery) 
Biography by CIDOB 

|-

|-

1918 births
2016 deaths
People from Viña del Mar
Aylwin family
Chilean people of Welsh descent
Chilean people of Basque descent
Chilean people of Irish descent
Chilean Roman Catholics
National Falange politicians
Christian Democratic Party (Chile) politicians
Presidents of Chile
Presidents of the Senate of Chile
Senators of the XLV Legislative Period of the National Congress of Chile
Senators of the XLVI Legislative Period of the National Congress of Chile
Senators of the XLVII Legislative Period of the National Congress of Chile
Candidates for President of Chile
Chilean anti-communists
20th-century Chilean lawyers
University of Chile alumni
Academic staff of the University of Chile
Academic staff of the Pontifical Catholic University of Chile
Recipients of the Grand Star of the Decoration for Services to the Republic of Austria
Knights Grand Cross of the Order of Merit of the Italian Republic
Collars of the Order of Isabella the Catholic
Fulbright alumni